"The 13th" is a song by English rock band the Cure, released as the first single from the band's 10th studio album, Wild Mood Swings (1996), on 22 April 1996. The song reached the top 20 in several territories, including Finland, Sweden, the United Kingdom, and Wallonia. It charted the highest in Hungary, where it reached number two, and in Italy, where it peaked at number five.

Release
The song reached number 15 on the UK Singles Chart and number 44 on the US Billboard Hot 100. The song was played very few times during the Swing Tour and never again since the tour.

Writing for AllMusic, Ned Raggett rated the single four stars out of five and noted the unexpected tone of the song: "There's no question that 'The 13th' was probably one of the Cure's most unexpected singles -- though horns had appeared on the single mix of 'Close to Me' back in 1985, the distinctly Latin percussion and brass on the song here was something else entirely!"

Clash magazine said that, alongside "Gone!", "The 13th" has become known for dividing fans, describing them as "love/hate affairs", but noted they "still [show] a band happy to experiment and play with conventions." Peter Parrish described "The 13th" as "a pseudo-latin number with a not-especially-hidden message about giving in to your lust."

Music video
The music video of the song shows Robert Smith, dressed in ripped velvet dress, lying on his bed and watching a TV broadcast where he performs with the Cure.  Comedian Sean Hughes also appears in the video.

Track listings
All tracks were written by Smith, Gallup, Bamonte, Cooper, and O'Donnell.

UK CD1 and Australian CD single
 "The 13th" (swing radio mix)
 "It Used to Be Me"
 "The 13th" (Killer Bee mix)

UK CD2
 "The 13th" (Two Chord Cool mix)
 "Ocean"
 "Adonais"

European CD and cassette single
 "The 13th" (swing radio mix)
 "It Used to Be Me"

US CD1 and cassette single
 "The 13th" (swing radio mix)
 "Adonais"

US CD2 and Canadian CD single
 "The 13th" (Two Chord Cool mix)
 "Ocean"
 "It Used to Be Me"
 "The 13th" (Killer Bee mix)

Personnel
 Robert Smith – vocals, guitar
 Simon Gallup – bass
 Perry Bamonte – guitar
 Roger O'Donnell – keyboards
 Jason Cooper – drums

Charts

Release history

References

External links
 

1996 singles
1996 songs
The Cure songs
Elektra Records singles
Fiction Records singles
Music videos directed by Sophie Muller
Songs written by Jason Cooper
Songs written by Perry Bamonte
Songs written by Robert Smith (musician)
Songs written by Roger O'Donnell
Songs written by Simon Gallup